The false osman (Schizopygopsis stoliczkai) is an Asian cyprinid freshwater fish living in the highlands of Afghanistan, southwestern China, Iran, northern India, Kyrgyzstan, Pakistan and Tajikistan. Young individuals and small adults live in shallow streams and pools, while large adults inhabit the main river and lakes.

References

Schizopygopsis
Fish of Afghanistan
Freshwater fish of China
Freshwater fish of India
Fish of Iran
Fish of Pakistan
Fauna of Tibet
Taxa named by Franz Steindachner
Fish described in 1866